The Oberrieder Weiher is like many other ponds in the valleys of Günz and Mindel a former gravel pit which is filled with ground water. The pond is located near the river Günz in the municipality of Breitenthal in the district of Günzburg. Because of this origin as gravel pit the form of the Oberrieder Weiher is nearly a square, covering . Sometimes it is said that it is the biggest flooded gravel pit in Bavarian Swabia.

The Oberrieder Weiher is a popular greenbelt recreation area. The northeastern shores have been used as a swimming area for many years. On the other shores are a campsite, a sailing club, and a surfing school. The Oberrieder Weiher is used by divers, too.

References 
This article incorporates in parts text translated from the article Oberrieder Weiher from the German Wikipedia, retrieved on 16 September 2009.

LOberrieder Weiher
Bodies of water of Günzburg (district)
Lakes of Bavaria